Bjørnar Øverland (born 19 August 1995) is a Norwegian racing cyclist. He competed in the men's team time trial event at the 2017 UCI Road World Championships.

Major results
2017
 National Road Championships
3rd Road race
6th Time trial

References

External links

1995 births
Living people
Norwegian male cyclists
Place of birth missing (living people)
21st-century Norwegian people